Cha Kyung-bok (10 January 1938 – 31 October 2006) was a South Korean football manager whose 37-year career, lasting from 1967 to 2004, made him one of his country's best-known and most-respected members of the sport world.

Early years
A native of the city of Jeongeup in Jeollabuk-do province, Cha Kyung-bok graduated from Joongdong High School and took a bachelor's degree from Kyunghee University, where, during his student days, he played on the national team. He joined Korea Republic national under-20 football team for the first AFC U-19 Championship in 1959 and won the championship. His primary sport, before he attended middle school, was volleyball, but subsequent to participating in and winning a football tournament in the intramural athletic meeting of his school, he started a new career as a football player, during which he played for the Industrial Bank of Korea FC for five years and then returned to Kyunghee University in 1967 as a coach.

Career highlights
During his long career, Cha acted as a referee and, in his position as referee assistant, was in charge of the final match in Los Angeles' 1984 Summer Olympics. He also worked for Korea Football Association as a President of Technical Committee, Disciplinary Committee.

As part of his career as an executive at the Industrial Bank of Korea FC, University of Incheon, and Kyunghee University, he became a manager of Jeonbuk Dinos in 1994. He was awarded Asian Football Confederation (AFC) Coach of the Year in 2003 and, during 1998–2004, while coaching Cheonan Ilhwa and after team moved to Seongnam and became Seongnam Ilhwa Chunma, make the team to win K-League three times in a row and qualify to AFC Champions League final in 2004, which gained him great affection from almost every fan of Seongnam FC even by now.

His good fortune, however, was not in evidence during his last year with Seongnam Ilhwa Chunma. Although he won the AFC Champions League final 1st leg beating Al-Ittihad (Jeddah) by a score of 3–1 in Jeddah, the opposing team ultimately inflicted a 5–0 rout. He resigned from the club shortly thereafter and died less than two years later of Lou Gehrig's disease, ten weeks before his 70th birthday, having spent the last five months in the hospital.

Honors

Manager

Club
Seongnam Ilhwa Chunma
K League 1 (3) : 2001, 2002, 2003
FA Cup (1) : 1999
League Cup (2) : 2002, 2004
Korean Super Cup (1) : 2002
A3 Champions Cup (1) : 2004

See also 
List of South Korean footballers
List of Koreans
List of football (soccer) players

References

External links
 
 

South Korean footballers
South Korean football managers
South Korean football referees
Jeonbuk Hyundai Motors managers
Seongnam FC managers
Sportspeople from North Jeolla Province
1938 births
2006 deaths
Place of death missing
Kyung Hee University alumni
Asian Games silver medalists for South Korea
Medalists at the 1962 Asian Games
Asian Games medalists in football
Association football forwards
Footballers at the 1962 Asian Games